Cyprinodon longidorsalis, the cachorrito de charco palmal or La Palma pupfish, is a species of fish in the family Cyprinodontidae. It was endemic to the Ojo de Agua la Presa in southwestern Nuevo Leon state in Mexico, but became extinct in the wild in 1994 due to habitat loss (now survives only in captivity). The same freshwater spring system was the home of three other pupfish: Cyprinodon ceciliae (extinct), Cyprinodon inmemoriam (extinct) and Cyprinodon veronicae (extinct in the wild, survives in captivity). Although these were from the same spring system, each was restricted to its own individual spring pool. This tiny spring pond also was the home of a now-extinct, undescribed species of Cambarellus crayfish.

Their color ranges from almost gray to a deep blue. It is somewhat distinctive for having a single long dorsal fin which leans back.

References

longidorsalis
Fish described in 1993
Endemic fish of Mexico
Freshwater fish of Mexico
Taxa named by María de Lourdes Lozano-Vilano
Taxa named by Salvador Contreras-Balderas 
Fish of North America becoming extinct since 1500
Taxonomy articles created by Polbot